Juan Carlos Suárez-Quiñones (born 1961) is a Spanish politician, jurist and judge. Ángel Ibáñez is a member of the People's Party of Castile and León. Juan Carlos is the current minister of development and the environment of Cortes of Castile and León, in office from 17 July 2019.

Career 
Juan Carlos member of the judicial career by opposition overcome in 1987. He was promoted to magistrate in 1990. Juan Carlos elected judge dean of the courts of the judicial party of león from December 2002 to February 2012. Juan Carlos was appointed deputy representative of the government in león in 2012.

Personal life
Juan Carlos was born in León, Spain. Juan Carlos has been a member of various commissions and reflection groups of the ministry of justice. Juan Carlos was honored in 1999 by the decree mayor of the león at the police academy. Juan Carlos was studied at University of León.

References 

1961 births
Living people
20th-century Spanish politicians
21st-century Spanish politicians
People from León, Spain
People's Party (Spain) politicians
20th-century Spanish judges
21st-century Spanish judges